Germany was represented by duo Hoffmann & Hoffmann, with the song "Rücksicht", at the 1983 Eurovision Song Contest, which took place on 23 April in Munich, following Nicole's victory for Germany in 1982. "Rücksicht" was the winner of the German national final, held on 19 March.

Before Eurovision

Ein Lied für München
The final was held at the Bayerischer Rundfunk TV studios in Munich, hosted by Carolin Reiber. 12 songs took part and the winner was chosen by a panel of approximately 500 people who had been selected as providing a representative cross-section of the German public. Among the other participants were former German representative Wencke Myhre (1968) and future entrant Ingrid Peters (1986).

At Eurovision 
On the night of the final Hoffmann & Hoffmann performed 14th in the running order, following Cyprus and preceding Denmark. At the close of voting "Rücksicht" had received 94 points, placing Germany 5th of the 20 entries, the country's fifth consecutive top 5 finish. The German jury awarded its 12 points to Sweden.

"Rücksicht" became the biggest domestic hit of Hoffmann & Hoffmann's career, reaching number 8 on the German singles chart. However, in March 1984, less than a year after their Eurovision appearance, lead singer Günter Hoffmann committed suicide at the age of 32.

Voting

References

1983
Countries in the Eurovision Song Contest 1983
Eurovision